Simhavarman III was a ruler of the Pallava dynasty who reigned in the first half of the 6th century AD. He is the father and predecessor of Simhavishnu. According to the Sivan Vāyil inscription, he performed 10 Aśvamedha (Daśāśvamedha), Bahusuvarṇa  & Kratu sacrifices.

Notes

References 

 

6th-century Indian monarchs
Pallava kings